The men's team time trial, a part of the cycling events at the 1928 Summer Olympics, took place in Amsterdam. The team event was simply an aggregation of results from the individual time trial event, with the best three times for each nation being added to give a team score.

Final classification

Source: Official results

References

Road cycling at the 1928 Summer Olympics
Cycling at the Summer Olympics – Men's team time trial